Thomas Edward Moore (December 23, 1962 – May 24, 1998) was an American professional golfer.

Moore was born in New Orleans, Louisiana. He had a decorated junior golf career, ranking #1 in the Junior Golf World Rankings in 1980 (Golf Digest). Moore played college golf at Oklahoma State where he was a teammate of Scott Verplank, Willie Wood, and Philip Walton. He won two events and was an All-American in 1982, 1983 and 1984 and helped his team win the NCAA Championship in 1983. He was also the program's 1st Academic All-American in 1984.

Moore played on the PGA Tour in 1990, 1991, and 1994. His best finish was a T4th at the 1990 Buick Southern Open. He also played on the Ben Hogan Tour/Nike Tour (now Web.com Tour) from 1991 to 1993. His best finish was a win at the 1993 Nike Boise Open.

After retiring from tournament golf, Moore worked as a teaching professional at English Turn Golf and Country Club in New Orleans.

Moore died in 1998 at age 35 of a rare blood disease diagnosed as primary amyloidosis.

The Tommy Moore Memorial Junior Golf Championship is held annually in conjunction with the All-State Sugar Bowl. The event is presented by the Kelly Gibson Foundation.

Professional wins (1)

Nike Tour wins (1)

Nike Tour playoff record (0–1)

See also
1993 Nike Tour graduates

References

External links

American male golfers
Oklahoma State Cowboys golfers
PGA Tour golfers
Korn Ferry Tour graduates
Golfers from Louisiana
Sportspeople from New Orleans
1962 births
1998 deaths